Khristinovka is a rural locality (a selo) in Sapronovsky Selsoviet of Mazanovsky District, Amur Oblast, Russia. The population was 37 as of 2018. There are 2 streets.

Geography 
Khristinovka is located 25 km south of Novokiyevsky Uval (the district's administrative centre) by road. Yubileynoye is the nearest rural locality.

References 

Rural localities in Mazanovsky District